Chapel Perilous is a 2013 comedy fantasy short film, directed by Matthew Lessner. The film had its premiere at the 2013 Stockholm International Film Festival on November 7, 2013. The film was screened at the 2014 Sundance Film Festival on January 17, 2014, where it won the Audience Award.

Plot

A door-to-door salesman, Robbin pays an unexpected visit to Levi Gold. This visit makes Levi confront his true mystical calling, as well as the nature of reality itself.

Cast
Kris Park as Robbin
David Gerson as Levi Gold
Bobby McGee as Dennis
Sun Araw as himself
Alina Aliluykina as Cleopatra

Reception
Chapel Perilous received mostly positive reviews from critics. Film Pulse scored the film 7.5 out of 10 and said, "Chapel Perilous is the type of short film that leaves you wanting more by the end. It doesn't lay all its cards on the table, and only gives you the bare minimum amount of information. The viewer is left to draw his or her own conclusions about the craziness that just transpired, but I can't help but think how much fun this could be as a feature film." Scott Beggs of Film School Rejects praised the film by saying that "it explores some radical, hilarious territory while grabbing you by the jaw. A literal crowd pleaser".

Accolades

References

External links
 Official website
 

2013 films
Sundance Film Festival award winners
American short films
2013 short films
2010s fantasy comedy films
2013 comedy films
2010s English-language films